This article lists the squads for the 2015 Cyprus Women's Cup, the 8th edition of the Cyprus Women's Cup. The cup consisted of a series of friendly games, and was held in Cyprus from 4 to 11 March 2015. The twelve national teams involved in the tournament registered a squad of 23 players.

The age listed for each player is on 4 March 2015, the first day of the tournament. The numbers of caps and goals listed for each player do not include any matches played after the start of tournament. The club listed is the club for which the player last played a competitive match prior to the tournament. The nationality for each club reflects the national association (not the league) to which the club is affiliated. A flag is included for coaches that are of a different nationality than their own national team.

Group A

Canada
Coach:  John Herdman

The squad was announced on 23 February 2015.

Italy
Coach: Antonio Cabrini

The squad was announced on 23 February 2015.

Scotland
Coach:  Anna Signeul

The squad was announced on 19 February 2015.

South Korea
Coach: Yoon Deok-yeo

The squad was announced on 16 February 2015.

Group B

Australia
Coach: Alen Stajcic

The squad was announced on 24 February 2015.

England
Coach:  Mark Sampson

The squad was announced on 20 February 2015. On 3 March 2015, Toni Duggan was added to the squad.

Finland
Coach:  Andrée Jeglertz

The squad was announced on 17 February 2015.

Netherlands
Coach: Roger Reijners

The squad was announced on 25 February 2015.

Group C

Belgium
Coach: Ives Serneels

Czech Republic
Coach: Stanislav Krejčík

Mexico
Coach: Leonardo Cuéllar

South Africa
Coach:  Vera Pauw

The squad was announced on 25 February 2015.

Player representation
Statistics are per the beginning of the competition.

By club
Clubs with 5 or more players represented are listed.

By club nationality

By club federation

By representatives of domestic league

References

2015